Asteromyia carbonifera is a species of gall midges in the family Cecidomyiidae. It creates galls on Solidago plants. Females can lay up to 300 eggs at a time and often collect conidia of the fungus Botryosphaeria dothidea, which is deposited on the plant alongside the eggs. The larvae grow within the gall that the fungus creates, a form of mutualism.

References

Further reading

External links

Cecidomyiinae
Articles created by Qbugbot
Insects described in 1862